Finnforest was a Finnish progressive rock band formed in the early 1970s from Kuopio, Finland.

Line-up
The line-up has included the following musicians:
 Pekka Tegelman (drums, bass, guitars)
 Jussi Tegelman (drums)
 Jukka Rissanen (keyboards)
 Jukka Linkola (keyboards)
 Pertti Pokki (keyboards)
 Jarmo Savolainen (keyboards)
 Jarmo Hiekkala (bass)
 Tuomo Helin (bass)
 Jari Rissanen (guitar)
 Heikki Keskinen (saxophone)

Discography
 Finnforest (Love Records LRLP 136, 1975)
 Lähtö matkalle (LRLP 193, 1976)
 Demonnights (LRLP 306, 1979)

External links
 [ Allmusic entry]

Finnish progressive rock groups